This is a list of mammals in California, including both current and recently historical inhabitants.

The California Department of Fish and Wildlife (CDFW) monitors certain species and subspecies of special concern. These are mammals whose populations may be locally threatened, but which are excluded from federal and international conservation lists. Taxa of special concern in California are noted below, as are endemic, introduced, harvest, and vagrant species.

There are 226 mammal species listed, including 185 terrestrial and 42 marine.

Opossums

Order: Didelphimorphia, Family: Didelphidae

One species of opossum occurs in California.

Eulipotyphlans

Order: Eulipotyphla, Family: Soricidae

Thirteen species of shrews occur in California.

 
Order: Eulipotyphla, Family: Talpidae

Five species of moles occur in California.

 Shrew-mole, Neurotrichus gibbsii
 Northern broad-footed mole, Scapanus latimanus
 Alameda Island mole, S. l. parvus (CDFW special concern; endemic)
Southern broad-footed mole (Scapanus  occultus)
 Coast mole, Scapanus orarius
 Townsend's mole, Scapanus townsendii

Bats

Order: Chiroptera, Family: Phyllostomidae

Four species of leaf-nosed bats occur in California.

 Mexican long-tongued bat, Choeronycteris mexicana (CDFW special concern)
 Southern long-nosed bat, Leptonycteris curasoae
 Lesser long-nosed bat, Leptonycteris yerbabuenae
 California leaf-nosed bat, Macrotus californicus (CDFW special concern)

Order: Chiroptera, Family: Vespertilionidae

Nineteen species of vesper bats occur in California.

 Hoary bat, Aeorestes cinereus
 Pallid bat, Antrozous pallidus (CDFW special concern)
 Townsend's big-eared bat, Corynorhinus townsendii 
 Pale big-eared bat, C. t. pallescens (CDFW special concern)
 Big brown bat, Eptesicus fuscus
 Spotted bat, Euderma maculatum (CDFW special concern)
 Allen's big-eared bat, Idionycteris phyllotis
 Silver-haired bat, Lasionycteris noctivagans
 Western red bat, Lasiurus blossevillii
 Western yellow bat, Lasiurus xanthinus
 California myotis, Myotis californicus
 Western small-footed myotis, Myotis ciliolabrum
 Long-eared myotis, Myotis evotis
 Little brown myotis, Myotis lucifugus
 Arizona myotis, Myotis occultus (CDFW special concern)
 Fringed myotis, Myotis thysanodes
 Cave myotis, Myotis velifer (CDFW special concern)
 Long-legged myotis, Myotis volans
 Yuma myotis, Myotis yumanensis
 Western pipistrelle, Parastrellus hesperus

Order: Chiroptera, Family: Molossidae

Four species of free-tailed bats occur in California.

 Western mastiff bat, Eumops perotis
 California mastiff bat, E. p. californicus (CDFW special concern)
 Pocketed free-tailed bat, Nyctinomops femorosaccus (CDFW special concern)
 Big free-tailed bat, Nyctinomops macrotis (CDFW special concern)
 Brazilian (or Mexican) free-tailed bat, Tadarida brasiliensis

Lagomorphs

Order: Lagomorpha
Family: Ochotonidae

One species of pika occurs in California.

 American pika, Ochotona princeps

Order: Lagomorpha
Family: Leporidae

Eight species of rabbits and hares occur in California.

 Pygmy rabbit, Brachylagus idahoensis (CDFW special concern, harvest)
 Snowshoe hare, Lepus americanus (harvest)
 Oregon snowshoe hare, L. a. klamathensis (CDFW special concern)
 Sierra Nevada snowshoe hare, L. a. tahoensis (CDFW special concern; endemic)
 Black-tailed jackrabbit, Lepus californicus (harvest)
 San Diego black-tailed jackrabbit, L. c. bennettii (CDFW special concern; endemic)
 White-tailed jackrabbit, Lepus townsendii (CDFW special concern, harvest)
 European rabbit, Oryctolagus cuniculus (introduced)
 Desert cottontail, Sylvilagus audubonii (harvest)
 Brush rabbit, Sylvilagus bachmani (harvest, except for endangered Riparian subspecies)
 Riparian brush rabbit, S. b. riparius (CDFW special concern; endemic)
 Mountain cottontail, Sylvilagus nuttallii (harvest)

Rodents

Order: Rodentia
Family: Aplodontiidae

One species of mountain beaver occurs in California.

 Mountain beaver, Aplodontia rufa
 Sierra Nevada mountain beaver, A. r. californica (CDFW special concern; endemic)
 Point Arena mountain beaver, A. r. nigra (CDFW special concern; endemic)
 Point Reyes mountain beaver, A. r. phaea (CDFW special concern; endemic)

Order: Rodentia
Family: Sciuridae

Thirty species of squirrels, chipmunks, and marmots occur in California.

Subfamily Sciurinae (tree squirrels and flying squirrels)
 Humboldt's flying squirrel, Glaucomys oregonensis
 San Bernardino flying squirrel, G. o. californicus (CDFW special concern; endemic)
 Northern flying squirrel, Glaucomys sabrinus (CDFW special concern)
 Eastern gray squirrel, Sciurus carolinensis (introduced, harvest)
 Western gray squirrel, Sciurus griseus (harvest)
 Eastern fox squirrel, Sciurus niger (introduced, harvest)
 Douglas' squirrel, Tamiasciurus douglasii (harvest)

Subfamily Xerinae (chipmunks and ground squirrels)
 White-tailed antelope ground squirrel, Ammospermophilus leucurus
 Nelson's antelope ground squirrel, Ammospermophilus nelsoni (endemic)
 Yellow-bellied marmot, Marmota flaviventris
 California ground squirrel, Spermophilus beecheyi
 Belding's ground squirrel, Spermophilus beldingi
 Golden-mantled ground squirrel, Spermophilus lateralis
 Mohave ground squirrel, Spermophilus mohavensis (endemic)
 Round-tailed ground squirrel, Spermophilus tereticaudus
 Palm Springs round-tailed ground squirrel, S. t. chlorus (CDFW special concern; endemic)
 Townsend's ground squirrel, Spermophilus townsendii
 Rock squirrel, Spermophilus variegatus
 Alpine chipmunk, Tamias alpinus (endemic)
 Yellow-pine chipmunk, Tamias amoenus
 Merriam's chipmunk, Tamias merriami
 Least chipmunk, Tamias minimus
 California chipmunk, Tamias obscurus
 Yellow-cheeked chipmunk, Tamias ochrogenys (endemic)
 Panamint chipmunk, Tamias panamintinus
 Long-eared chipmunk, Tamias quadrimaculatus
 Allen's chipmunk, Tamias senex
 Siskiyou chipmunk, Tamias siskiyou
 Sonoma chipmunk, Tamias sonomae (endemic)
 Lodgepole chipmunk, Tamias speciosus
 Uinta chipmunk, Tamias umbrinus

Order: Rodentia
Family: Castoridae

One species of beaver occurs in California.

 American beaver, Castor canadensis (harvest)

Order: Rodentia
Family: Geomyidae

Five species of pocket gophers occur in California.

 Botta's pocket gopher, Thomomys bottae
 Western pocket gopher, Thomomys mazama
 Mountain pocket gopher, Thomomys monticola
 Northern pocket gopher, Thomomys talpoides
 Townsend's pocket gopher, Thomomys townsendii

Order: Rodentia
Family: Heteromyidae

Twenty-six species of pocket mice and kangaroo rats occur in California.

Subfamily Dipodomyinae (kangaroo rats and mice)
 Pacific (or agile) kangaroo rat, Dipodomys agilis (endemic)
 California kangaroo rat, Dipodomys californicus
 Marysville California kangaroo rat, D. californicus eximus (CDFW special concern; endemic)
 Desert kangaroo rat, Dipodomys deserti
 Big-eared kangaroo rat, Dipodomys elephantinus (CDFW special concern; endemic)
 Heermann's kangaroo rat, Dipodomys heermanni (endemic)
 Giant kangaroo rat, Dipodomys ingens (endemic)
 Merriam's kangaroo rat, Dipodomys merriami
 San Bernardino Merriam's kangaroo rat, D. merriami parvus (CDFW special concern; endemic)
 Chisel-toothed kangaroo rat, Dipodomys microps
 Fresno kangaroo rat, Dipodomys nitratoides (endemic)
 Short-nosed kangaroo rat, D. n. brevinasus (CDFW special concern; endemic)
 Tipton kangaroo rat, D. n. nitratoides (CDFW special concern; endemic)
 Ord's kangaroo rat, Dipodomys ordii
 Panamint kangaroo rat, Dipodomys panamintinus
 San Diego kangaroo rat, Dipodomys simulans
 Stephens' kangaroo rat, Dipodomys stephensi (endemic)
 Narrow-faced kangaroo rat, Dipodomys venustus (endemic)
 Dark kangaroo mouse, Microdipodops megacephalus
 Pale kangaroo mouse, Microdipodops pallidus

Subfamily Perognathinae (pocket mice)
 Bailey's pocket mouse, Chaetodipus baileyi
 California pocket mouse, Chaetodipus californicus
 Dulzura pocket mouse, C. c. femoralis (CDFW special concern; endemic)
 San Diego pocket mouse, Chaetodipus fallax
 Northwestern San Diego pocket mouse, C. f. fallax (CDFW special concern; endemic)
 Pallid San Diego pocket mouse, C. f. pallidus (CDFW special concern; endemic)
 Long-tailed pocket mouse, Chaetodipus formosus
 Desert pocket mouse, Chaetodipus penicillatus
 Spiny pocket mouse, Chaetodipus spinatus
 White-eared pocket mouse, Perognathus alticola (endemic)
 White-eared pocket mouse, P. a. alticola (CDFW special concern; endemic)
 Tehachapi pocket mouse, P. a. inexpectatus (CDFW special concern; endemic)
 San Joaquin pocket mouse, Perognathus inornatus (endemic)
 Salinas pocket mouse, P. i. psammophilus (CDFW special concern; endemic)
 Little pocket mouse, Perognathus longimembris
 Palm Springs pocket mouse, P. l. bangsi (CDFW special concern; endemic)
 Los Angeles pocket mouse, P. l. brevinasus (CDFW special concern; endemic)
 Jacumba pocket mouse, P. l. internationalis (CDFW special concern; endemic)
 Pacific pocket mouse, P. l. pacificus (CDFW special concern; endemic)
 Great Basin pocket mouse, Perognathus parvus

Order: Rodentia
Family: Cricetidae

Twenty-nine species of voles and New World rats and mice occur in California.

Subfamily Arvicolinae (lemmings, voles, and muskrat)
 White-footed vole, Arborimus albipes (CDFW special concern)
 Red tree vole, Arborimus longicaudus presence uncertain
 Sonoma tree vole, Arborimus pomo (CDFW special concern; endemic)
 Western red-backed vole, Clethrionomys californicus
 Sagebrush vole, Lemmiscus curtatus
 California vole, Microtus californicus
 Monterey vole, M. c. halophilus (endemic)
 Mojave River vole, M. c. mohavensis (CDFW special concern; endemic)
 San Pablo vole, M. c. sanpabloensis (CDFW special concern; endemic)
 Amargosa vole, M. c. scirpensis (federal and state endangered; endemic)
 South coast marsh vole, M. c. stephensi (CDFW special concern; endemic)
 Owens Valley vole, M. c. vallicola (CDFW special concern; endemic)
 Long-tailed vole, Microtus longicaudus
 Montane vole, Microtus montanus
 Creeping vole, Microtus oregoni
 Townsend's vole, Microtus townsendii
 Muskrat, Ondatra zibethicus (introduced, harvest)
 Heather vole, Phenacomys intermedius

Subfamily Neotominae (North American rats and mice)
 White-throated woodrat, Neotoma albigula
 Bushy-tailed woodrat, Neotoma cinerea
 Dusky-footed woodrat, Neotoma fuscipes
 Desert woodrat, Neotoma lepida
 Large-eared woodrat, Neotoma macrotis
 Northern grasshopper mouse, Onychomys leucogaster
 Southern grasshopper mouse, Onychomys torridus
 Brush mouse, Peromyscus boylii
 California mouse, Peromyscus californicus
 Canyon mouse, Peromyscus crinitus
 Cactus mouse, Peromyscus eremicus
 Northern Baja deer mouse, Peromyscus fraterculus
Gambel's deer mouse, Peromyscus gambelii
Western deer mouse, Peromyscus sonoriensis
 Pinyon mouse, Peromyscus truei
 Salt marsh harvest mouse, Reithrodontomys raviventris (endemic)
 Western harvest mouse, Reithrodontomys megalotis

Subfamily Sigmodontinae (cotton rats)
 Arizona cotton rat, Sigmodon arizonae
 Hispid cotton rat, Sigmodon hispidus

Order: Rodentia
Family: Muridae

Three species of Old World rats and mice occur in California.

 House mouse, Mus musculus (introduced)
 Norway rat, Rattus norvegicus (introduced)
 Black rat, Rattus rattus (introduced)

Order: Rodentia
Family: Dipodidae

Two species of jumping mice occur in California.

 Western jumping mouse, Zapus princeps
 Pacific jumping mouse, Zapus trinotatus

Order: Rodentia
Family: Erethizontidae

One species of porcupine occurs in California.

 North American porcupine, Erethizon dorsatum

Whales, dolphins and porpoises

Order: Cetacea
Family: Eschrichtiidae

One species of gray whale occurs in California's waters.

 Gray whale, Eschrichtius robustus (migrant)

Order: Cetacea
Family: Balaenopteridae

Six species of rorquals occur in California's waters.

 Minke whale, Balaenoptera acutorostrata
 Bryde's whale, Balaenoptera brydei (vagrant)
 Sei whale, Balaenoptera borealis
 Blue whale, Balaenoptera musculus
 Fin whale, Balaenoptera physalus
 Humpback whale, Megaptera novaeangliae

Order: Cetacea
Family: Balaenidae

One species of right whale occurs in California's waters.

 North Pacific right whale, Eubalaena japonica (vagrant)

Order: Cetacea
Family: Delphinidae

Twelve species of dolphins occur in California's waters.

 Short-beaked common dolphin, Delphinus delphis
 Long-beaked common dolphin, Delphinus capensis
 Short-finned pilot whale, Globicephala macrorhynchus 
 Risso's dolphin, Grampus griseus
 Northern right whale dolphin, Lissodelphis borealis
 Killer whale, Orcinus orca
 False killer whale, Pseudorca crassidens (vagrant)
 Pacific white-sided dolphin, Sagmatias obliquidens
 Pantropical spotted dolphin, Stenella attenuata (vagrant)
 Striped dolphin, Stenella coeruleoalba
 Rough-toothed dolphin, Steno bredanensis (vagrant)
 Common bottlenose dolphin, Tursiops truncatus

Order: Cetacea
Family: Phocoenidae

Two species of porpoises occur in California's waters.

 Harbour porpoise, Phocoena phocoena
 Dall's porpoise, Phocoenoides dalli

Order: Cetacea
Family: Kogiidae

Two species of small sperm whales occur in California's waters.

 Pygmy sperm whale, Kogia breviceps
 Dwarf sperm whale, Kogia sima

Order: Cetacea
Family: Physeteridae

One species of sperm whale occur in California's waters.

 Sperm whale, Physeter macrocephalus

Order: Cetacea
Family: Ziphiidae

Seven species of beaked whales occur in California's waters.

 Giant beaked whale, Berardius bairdii
 Hubbs' beaked whale, Mesoplodon carlhubbsi
 Blainville's beaked whale, Mesoplodon densirostris
 Ginkgo-toothed beaked whale, Mesoplodon ginkgodens
 Perrin's beaked whale, Mesoplodon perrini
 Stejneger's beaked whale, Mesoplodon stejnegeri
 Cuvier's beaked whale, Ziphius cavirostris

Carnivorans

Order: Carnivora
Family: Canidae

Six species of canids occur in California.

 Coyote, Canis latrans
 Gray wolf, Canis lupus (extirpated 1924, resettled 2017)
Cascade Mountains wolf, C. l. fuscus (extinct)
Northwestern wolf, C. l .occidentalis
 Gray fox, Urocyon cinereoargenteus (harvest)
 Island fox, Urocyon littoralis (endemic)
 Kit fox, Vulpes macrotis
 Red fox, Vulpes vulpes 
Order: Carnivora
Family: Ursidae

Two species of bears occurred in California. One was recently extirpated.

 Black bear, Ursus americanus (harvest)
 Brown bear, Ursus arctos (extirpated 1931)
California grizzly bear, U. a. californicus (extinct)

Order: Carnivora
Family: Procyonidae

Two species of this nocturnal, omnivorous family occur in California.

 Ring-tailed cat, Bassariscus astutus
 Raccoon, Procyon lotor (harvest)

Order: Carnivora
Family: Mephitidae

Two species of skunks occur in California.

 Striped skunk, Mephitis mephitis (harvest)
 Western spotted skunk, Spilogale gracilis (harvest)
 Channel Islands spotted skunk, S. g. amphiala (CDFW special concern; endemic)

Order: Carnivora
Family: Felidae

Three species of cats occurred in California. One was recently extirpated.
 Bobcat, Lynx rufus (harvest)
 Jaguar, Panthera onca (extirpated 1826)
 Cougar, Puma concolor

Order: Carnivora
Family: Mustelidae

 Sea otter, Enhydra lutris
 Wolverine, Gulo gulo (vagrant)
 North American river otter, Lontra canadensis
 Pacific marten, Martes caurina
Humboldt marten, M. c. humboldtensis (CDFW special concern)
 American ermine, Mustela richardsonii
 Long-tailed weasel, Neogale frenata
 American mink, Neogale vison
 Fisher, Pekania pennanti
 American badger, Taxidea taxus

Order: Carnivora
Family: Otariidae

Four species of eared seals occur in California.

 Guadalupe fur seal, Arctophoca townsendi
 Northern fur seal, Callorhinus ursinus
 Northern (Steller) sea lion, Eumetopias jubatus
 California sea lion, Zalophus californianus

Order: Carnivora
Family: Phocidae

Four species of earless seals occur in California.

 Northern elephant seal, Mirounga angustirostris
 Ribbon seal, Phoca fasciata (vagrant)
 Harbor seal, Phoca vitulina
 Ringed seal, Phoca hispida (vagrant)

Even-toed ungulates

Order: Artiodactyla
Family: Antilocapridae

One species of pronghorn occurs in California.

 Pronghorn, Antilocapra americana (harvest)

Order: Artiodactyla
Family: Bovidae

Two species of bison, cattle, goats, and sheep occur in California.

 Barbary sheep, Ammotragus lervia (introduced, harvest)
 Bison, Bison bison (extirpated early 1800s, introduced on Santa Catalina Island)
 Bighorn sheep, Ovis canadensis (harvest)
 Sierra Nevada bighorn sheep, O. c. sierrae

Order: Artiodactyla
Family: Cervidae

Four species of deer and elk occur in California.
 Elk, Cervus canadensis
 Tule elk, C. c. nannodes (endemic)
 European fallow deer, Dama dama (introduced, harvest)
 Mule deer, Odocoileus hemionus (harvest)
 California mule deer, O. h. californicus
 Columbian black-tailed deer, O. h. columbianus
 Southern mule deer, O. h. fuliginatus
 Inyo mule deer, O. h. inyoensis
 White-tailed deer, Odocoileus virginianius

Order: Artiodactyla
Family: Suidae

One species of pig occurs in California.

 Wild boar, Sus scrofa (introduced, harvest)

References

Bibliography
  This is the primary source for most species on this list.
  This is the primary source for special statuses, and for including certain subspecies in addition to species.
  The ASM list provides the distribution and other information.
  Whenever possible, the taxonomy of mammals here has been updated to agree with the latest edition of MSW.
 

Mammals
California